Sun God or Sun Goddess may refer to

 a solar deity
 see List of solar deities
Sun God (statue), monumental figure at the University of California, San Diego
Sun God Festival, music festival at the University of California, San Diego
Sun God (band), European electronic music group active 1994–2020
Sun God (album), 1995 debut release by the band Sun God
Sun God (rapper), son of Ghostface Killah of Wu-Tang Clan
"Sun God" (song), track on the 2020 album Pegasus by Trippie Redd
Sun Goddess (album), 1974 jazz release by Ramsey Lewis
"Sun Goddess" (song), title track of the Ramsey Lewis album

See also
 What If God Were the Sun?, 2007  television film based on the 2000 novel of the same name by John Edward